"Do You Wanna Be My Baby?" is the first single from Swedish singer-songwriter Per Gessle's third studio album, The World According to Gessle (1997). It peaked atop the Swedish Singles Chart for one week in April 1997 and also charted in Iceland and the Flanders region of Belgium. B-side "Always Breaking My Heart" was also recorded by Belinda Carlisle for her album A Woman and a Man.

Music video
The video was directed by Jonas Åkerlund and featured members from a circus which performed several acts.

Track listings
 European CD single
 "Do You Wanna Be My Baby?" – 3:47
 "Always Breaking My Heart" (Tits & Ass demo, 30 May 1995) – 3:06

 Australian and Japanese CD single
 "Do You Wanna Be My Baby?" – 3:47
 "Always Breaking My Heart" (Tits & Ass demo, 30 May 1995) – 3:06
 "I Wanna Be with You" (Tits & Ass demo, 2 November 1994) – 2:51

Charts

Weekly charts

Year-end charts

Certifications

References

1997 singles
1997 songs
Music videos directed by Jonas Åkerlund
Number-one singles in Sweden
Per Gessle songs
Songs written by Per Gessle